Violetta Pavlovna Kolesnikova (Russian: Виолетта Павловна Колесникова; 24 August 1938 – 26 March 2022) was a Russian animator and Honored Artist of the RSFSR (1989). She is known for her work on The Bremen Town Musicians, Winnie-the-Pooh, and The Mystery of the Third Planet.

References

1938 births
2022 deaths
Soviet animators
Russian women animators
Academic staff of High Courses for Scriptwriters and Film Directors
Honored Artists of the RSFSR